Stig (also spelled Stieg) is a common masculine Scandinavian given name. The name has origins in Old West Norse Stígr, and derives from the word stiga, meaning "wanderer". Originally a nickname, it later became a given name. The nicknames Stickan and Stikkan derive from Stig.

Notable people with the name Stig include:

Arts and entertainment

Writing
Stig Dagerman (1923–1954), Swedish author and journalist
Stig Dalager (born 1952), Danish writer
Stig Gælok (born 1961), Sami poet
Stieg Larsson (1954–2004), Swedish journalist and writer
Stig Sæterbakken (1966–2012), Norwegian author

Film and television
Stig Egede-Nissen (1907–1988), Norwegian actor and naval officer
Stig Järrel (1910–1998), Swedish actor, film director and revue artist
Stig Olin (1920–2008), Swedish actor, theatre director, singer and songwriter

Music
Stig Anderson (1931–1997), manager of the Swedish band ABBA
Stig Johansen, member of the band The Sins of Thy Beloved
Stig Olin (1920–2008), Swedish actor, theatre director, singer, and songwriter
Stig Rästa (born 1980), Estonian musician

Other arts and entertainment
Stig Asmussen, American video game developer
Stig Lindberg (1916–1982), Swedish designer

Government, politics and espionage
Stig Bergling (1937–2015), Swedish police officer and convicted Soviet agent
Stig Henriksson (born 1955), Swedish politician
Stig Löfgren (1912–1998), Swedish Army lieutenant general
Per Stig Møller (born 1942), Danish politician
Stig Synnergren (1915–2004), Supreme Commander of the Swedish Armed Forces 
Stig Wennerström (1906–2006), Swedish Air Force colonel, convicted of treason in 1963

Sports

Football (soccer)
Stig Inge Bjørnebye (born 1969), Norwegian footballer
Stig Fredriksson (born 1956), Swedish footballer
Stig Johansen (born 1972), Norwegian footballer
Stig Arild Råket (born 1978), Norwegian footballer
Stig Tøfting (born 1969), Danish footballer

Other sports
Stig Berge (born 1942), Norwegian orienteer
Stig Blomqvist (born 1946), Swedish rally driver
Stig Roar Husby (born 1954), Norwegian long-distance runner
Stig Severinsen (born 1973), Danish freediver
Stig Strand (born 1956), Swedish skier
Stig Wennerström (sailor) (born 1943), Swedish Olympic silver medalist in sailing
Stig Wetzell (born 1945), Finnish ice hockey player

Other fields
Stig M. Bergström (born 1935), Swedish-American paleontologist
Stig Guldberg (1916–1980), Danish founder of the Guldberg-Plan
Stig Andersen Hvide (died 1293), Danish nobleman and magnate
Stig Strömholm (born 1931), Swedish legal scholar
Stig Vilhelmson (born 1956), Swedish businessman

See also

Security Technical Implementation Guide (STIG)

References

Danish masculine given names
Norwegian masculine given names
Swedish masculine given names